Neuropsychiatric quinism is a chronic encephalopathy due to intoxication by mefloquine, quinacrine, chloroquine. It is associated with brain dysfunction and brainstem dysfunction. It may be confused as posttraumatic stress disorder (PTSD) and traumatic brain injury (TBI). In the opinion of one medical author it "may have been widely unrecognized in veteran populations, and its symptoms misattributed to other causes." Symptoms include, but are not limited to, limbic encephalopathy and neurotoxic vestibulopathy.

Symptoms
This neuropsychiatric syndrome is defined by several symptoms that distinguish it from others:

Very high probability
 delirium
 confusion
 disorientation

Moderate probability
 dementia
 amnesia
 seizures

Prodromal
 anxiety
 depression
 sleep disturbance
 abnormal dreams
 dizziness
 vertigo
 paresthesias

References

Quinine
Poisoning by drugs, medicaments and biological substances
Neurological disorders
Diseases of the ear and mastoid process